

Numbers 404 and 405 were the sole two examples of a unique seaplane design produced for the flying service of the Imperial German Navy during the First World War. By 1917, the output of the major German seaplane manufacturers was taken up producing machines for front-line service. As a consequence, the only machines available for training purposes were those that had been made obsolete or which had been damaged and rebuilt. In order to provide modern trainers for the Navy, the Kaiserliche Werft Danzig undertook the design and construction of two brand-new seaplanes between March and June, unarmed two-seat biplanes. These machines were supplied to the naval base at Putzig along with a batch of four trainers of a different design, numbered 467–470.

Specifications

Notes

References
 
 
 

1910s German military trainer aircraft
404
Floatplanes
Single-engined tractor aircraft
Biplanes
Aircraft first flown in 1917